The Pakistan Green Party, also known as the Pakistan Greens, is a green political party in Pakistan. It was founded on April 28, 2002, and is currently led by Liaquat Ali Shaikh.

Platform 
The ten basic values, or policy positions of the Pakistan Greens are similar to the ten principles of other green parties:
 Grassroots democracy
 Social justice and equal opportunity
 Ecological wisdom (ecosophy)
 Non-violence
 Decentralization of authority from Power to the People
 Community-based economics and economic justice
 Gender equity
 Respect for diversity
 Personal and global responsibility
 Sustainability

References

External links 
 Official Website
 

Green political parties
Political parties in Pakistan
Political parties established in 2002
Secularism in Pakistan
2002 establishments in Pakistan
Pakistan